Csesztreg is a village in Zala County, Hungary.

Etymology
The name comes from a Slavic hydronym *Čistъ strugъ: clean stream. 1334/1347 Cheztregh.

Sport
Csesztreg SE, association football club

References

External links 
 Street map 

Populated places in Zala County